Darryl Yaw A. Marfo (born 1 November 1990) is a Scottish international rugby player. He has previously played for Harlequins,  Bath and Leicester Tigers in Premiership Rugby, London Scottish, London Welsh and Ealing Trailfinders in the RFU Championship and Edinburgh in the Pro14.  On 11 November 2017 he made his  debut against , and has gained three caps.

Early life
Marfo was born in Westminster, London, to a Scottish mother.  He grew up in Pimlico Marfo regularly visited his mother's family in Ayr.

A family friend introduced Marfo to rugby at Battersea Ironsides

Club career
Marfo joined Harlequins academy as a 14yr-old, making his debut at 20 years old in September 2011 against Gloucester. He left Harlequins at the end of the 2014-15 season, to join London Welsh. When London Welsh were liquidated in December 2016 Marfo was worried that he would not be able to find a professional rugby contract, however quickly joined Bath on a short-term contract in January 2017.
In the summer of 2017, Marfo signed a one-year contract with Edinburgh. He left the club in December 2019. He signed a short-term deal with Leicester Tigers in March 2021, but was released on 16 June 2021 without playing a game.

International career
Marfo received his first call up to the senior Scotland squad by coach Gregor Townsend in October 2017 for the Autumn Internationals. He is eligible for Scotland through his Scottish born mother. He made his international debut on 11 November 2017 against , and also started against  and in Scotland's record win against .

References

External links
 Stats
 Scotland profile

1990 births
Living people
Rugby union players from London
People educated at Pangbourne College
Rugby union props
Harlequin F.C. players
London Scottish F.C. players
Ealing Trailfinders Rugby Club players
London Welsh RFC players
Bath Rugby players
Edinburgh Rugby players
Scotland international rugby union players
Ospreys (rugby union) players
Leicester Tigers players
Nottingham R.F.C. players